Respiratory alkalosis is a medical condition in which increased respiration elevates the blood pH beyond the normal range (7.35–7.45) with a concurrent reduction in arterial levels of carbon dioxide. This condition is one of the four primary disturbance of acid–base homeostasis.

Signs and symptoms

Signs and symptoms of respiratory alkalosis are as follows:
 Palpitation
 Tetany
 Convulsion
 Sweating

Causes
Respiratory alkalosis may be produced as a result of the following causes:

Mechanism

The mechanism of respiratory alkalosis generally occurs when some stimulus makes a person hyperventilate. The increased breathing produces increased alveolar respiration, expelling CO2 from the circulation. This alters the dynamic chemical equilibrium of carbon dioxide in the circulatory system. Circulating hydrogen ions and bicarbonate are shifted through the carbonic acid (H2CO3) intermediate to make more CO2 via the enzyme carbonic anhydrase according to the following reaction:  This causes decreased circulating hydrogen ion concentration, and increased pH (alkalosis).

Diagnosis
The diagnosis of respiratory alkalosis is done via test that measure the oxygen and carbon dioxide levels (in the blood), chest x-ray and a pulmonary function test of the individual.

The Davenport diagram allows clinicians or investigators to outline blood bicarbonate concentrations (and blood pH) after a respiratory or metabolic acid-base disturbance

Classification
There are two types of respiratory alkalosis: chronic and acute as a result of the 3–5 day delay in kidney compensation of the abnormality.
 Acute respiratory alkalosis occurs rapidly, have a high pH because the response of the kidneys is slow.
 Chronic respiratory alkalosis is a more long-standing condition, here one finds the kidneys have time to decrease the bicarbonate level.

pH
 Alkalosis refers to the process due to which there is elevation of blood pH.
 Alkalemia refers to an arterial blood pH of greater than 7.45.

Treatment
Respiratory alkalosis is very rarely life-threatening, though pH level should not be 7.5 or greater. The aim in treatment is to detect the underlying cause. When PaCO2 is adjusted rapidly in individuals with chronic respiratory alkalosis, metabolic acidosis may occur. If the individual is on a mechanical ventilator then preventing hyperventilation is done via monitoring ABG levels.

In popular culture
In The Andromeda Strain, one of the characters is exposed to contamination, but saves himself by increasing his respiratory rate to induce alkalosis.

See also

References

Further reading

External links

Acid–base disturbances